Farah Nasser is a Canadian journalist. In May 2015, she was named by Shaw Media as the co-anchor of Global Toronto's 5:30pm and 6pm newscast, alongside Alan Carter. Previous to this role, she was a reporter and anchor with CablePulse24 in Toronto in 2010.

She previously anchored Citytv Toronto's CityNews weekend editions at 6 p.m. and 11 p.m. with Roger Petersen from 2007 until she was laid off on January 19, 2010.  CITY-TV announced cuts to several news programs and staff.  The weekend news was cancelled, and Nasser was part of a company-wide layoff that affected 6% of CITY's staff, and several on-air presenters.

In June 2022, Global News announced that Nasser would be moving from Global Toronto to join Global National, as weekend anchor.

Early life 
Nasser was born and raised in Mississauga, Ontario, Canada, and moved to Toronto to work as a journalist at Newstalk 1010 (1999-2003), Toronto 1 (2003-2005) before joining /A\ Channel News in Barrie (2005-2007).

In 2001, at the age of 20, she landed a summer job with CNN in New Delhi, India. She was then a second-year radio and television student at (then) Ryerson Polytechnic University. She also studied European Media Studies at University of Westminster in London.

References

External links
CP24.com profile

Canadian Ismailis
Canadian people of Indian descent
Canadian people of Tanzanian descent
Canadian television news anchors
Living people
Journalists from Toronto
Toronto Metropolitan University alumni
Canadian women television journalists
Year of birth missing (living people)